Hyde Park Square is a residential, tree-planted, garden square one block north of Hyde Park fronted by classical buildings, many of which are listed and marks a crossover of Lancaster Gate and Connaught Village neighbourhoods of Bayswater, London. It measures (internally) 200 by 500 feet, of which the bulk is the private communal garden – the rest is street-lit, pavemented streets with low railings in front of the houses.

History and layout
The square was part of "Tyburnia" planned in 1827 by Samuel Pepys Cockerell for the then semi-rural prime holding of the diocese controlled by the Bishop of London but was laid out to a modified plan by his successor George Gutch.

Aside from an approach street or road at its four corners it marks the end of:
Clarendon Place, a broad-pavemented 156-metre approach road, and
Connaught Street, which features high street services, coffee shops and restaurants, including Connaught Village.

Numbering runs in one set for each side, anticlockwise, from south-east:
1, 2
10 (large), 13 to 20A, 21 (co-fronts and shared building with 43 & 43A Gloucester Square); 
22 to 24
30 to 37 (37 being a shared building with 8 Clarendon Place), 38 to 47 (slightly below average in their frontage width).

Buildings

№s 11–20A and 21 on the north side are grade II listed buildings, thus statutorily protected. №s 30–37 (the west of the south side) is too, likewise, built around 1830–40, probably by George Ledwell Taylor.

Residents
№ 13 was the family home of architect Peter Dollar (died 1943). 
№ 8 was that of merchant, shipowner John Boulcott (died 1855).

References

External links 

Squares in the City of Westminster
Hyde Park, London
Bayswater
Tyburnia